Head crater is a small crater in Mare Cognitum on the Moon. The name of the crater was formally adopted by the IAU in 1973.  

The Apollo 12 astronauts Pete Conrad and Alan Bean landed the Lunar Module (LM) Intrepid northeast of Head crater on November 24, 1969.  To the east of Head is the larger Surveyor crater. To the southwest are Bench crater and Sharp crater (now called Sharp-Apollo).  To the northwest of Head is the larger crater Middle Crescent.

It is called Head because the pattern of craters in the area resembles that of a snowman (with Surveyor crater forming the body) when viewed from the east, as in the landing approach.

Samples
Lunar sample 12055, a pigeonite basalt, was collected on the north rim of Head crater.  The crew dug a small trench about 15 m inside the northwest rim of Head crater.  Soil samples 12033 and 12034 were collected from it.  12033 is a ropy glass sample that has been suggested came from Copernicus crater and may represent material from the Fra Mauro formation.  Sample 12034 is regolith breccia.  Its composition does not match the other regolith samples from the site and is presumed to have a distant origin.

References

Impact craters on the Moon
Apollo 12